Abu Dhalouf is a town on the north coast of Qatar, located in the municipality of Al Shamal. It was demarcated in 1988 and is bounded by Madinat ash Shamal to the immediate east, with Ar Ru'ays located to the immediate east of Madinat ash Shamal.

Etymology
In Arabic, 'abu' means 'father' and in this context is used to describe an area with a distinct feature. 'Dhalouf' is derived from the Arabic term 'dhalfa', which is the name given to the curved ends of saddles used for camel riding. It was so-named because of a prominent hill that resembled the end of a saddle.

Alternative transliterations of the name are Abu Dhaluf, Abū Ḑalūf, Abu Dhuluf, and Abū Z̧ulūf.

History
In the 1820s, George Barnes Brucks was tasked with preparing the first British survey of the Persian Gulf. He wrote down the following notes about Abu Dhalouf, which he referred to as Boodeshoof:

J.G. Lorimer's Gazetteer of the Persian Gulf gives an account of Abu Dhalouf in 1908:

Reiterating details present in G.B. Brucks' earlier report, Lorimer also stated that prior to 1856, the village was inhabited by about 50 men of the Bu Kuwara (Kuwari) tribe.

Landmarks

Many historic mosques exist in the town. One of the most popular attractions in the town is Abu Dhalouf Park. It is situated along the Abu Dhalouf Beach, providing a vantage point of the Persian Gulf, and is also near the town center. The park draws in thousands of visitors every year from elsewhere in the north and from Doha. In 2016, it was reported that several locals had lodged complaints stating that the park had fallen into disrepair. They claimed that the landscaping and children's playground equipment were deteriorating, and that the park lacked suitable lighting at night. Thus, in April 2016, the Ministry of Municipality and Environment began a QR 12.5 million renovation that spanned the park's 17,000 m2 area.

Education
The settlement's first formal school was opened in 1957.

References

Populated places in Al Shamal
Populated coastal places in Qatar